Blue Flyer (formerly Zipper Dipper and Warburtons  Milk Roll-A-Coaster) is a Wooden roller coaster at Nickelodeon Land, Blackpool Pleasure Beach in Blackpool, England. It was built in 1934. It is believed to have been built by Charlie Paige. It is a family coaster.

Blue Flyer operates with one train, which was built by Philadelphia Toboggan Coasters. The train is made up of 5 cars, each car seats 4 people in 2 rows, each row seating 2 people, making for a total of 20 people in the train.

Blue Flyer is an ACE Coaster Classic.

Pleasure Beach Resort closed Beaver Creek's Children Park in Autumn 2010. Zipper Dipper was rethemed and was transformed into Blue Flyer with the opening of Nickelodeon Land on 4 May 2011.

The ride was designated as a Grade II listed building on 19 April 2017.

The Ride
Blue Flyer begins with a  lift hill to the ride's highest height, followed by a drop into three small hills and a tunnel, located inside the building where Space Invader 2 was located. The ride exits the tunnel and travels along a slight decline before entering the brakes section and rolling into the station.

Sponsorship
Blue Flyer was briefly sponsored by Warburtons, and was known as the Warburtons Milk Roll-a-coaster, although all signage still read Zipper Dipper for the duration of the sponsorship as that was the ride's name before Nickelodeon Land.

See also

Listed buildings in Blackpool

Gallery

References

Blackpool Pleasure Beach
Roller coasters in the United Kingdom
2011 establishments in England